The hot foot is a prank where the prankster sets the victim's shoe laces or shoe on fire with a match or lighter.  

There are several other versions of the hot foot prank, but all involve using a source of flame near a victim's foot.  Other versions of the prank involve using a cigarette on the victim's heel, placing a lit match between two bare toes on the victim, or sticking a book of matches to the victim's shoe with gum and lighting the matches.  

The hot foot prank is mentioned in several baseball stories as a prank that players play on one another. Bert Blyleven earned the nickname "Frying Dutchman" because of his love of this prank; during Blyleven's time with the Angels, the fire extinguisher in the Angel Stadium clubhouse featured a sign that said "In case of Blyleven: Pull."  

Former relief pitcher and pitching coach Roger McDowell was also known for the prank. During his time with the New York Mets, he was featured in a segment of the team's 1986 World Series championship video in which he and teammate Howard Johnson demonstrate how to do it.

See also
 List of practical joke topics

References

Practical jokes
Fire